The 2022 Firenze Open (also known as the 2022 UniCredit Firenze Open for sponsorship purposes) is a professional men's tennis tournament to be played on indoor hard courts. It will be the 1st edition of the ATP Florence event since 1994, and part of the ATP Tour 250 series of the 2022 ATP Tour. It will be played at Palazzo Wanny in Florence, Italy, from 10 to 16 October 2022.

The event was one of the six tournaments that were given single-year ATP 250 licenses in September and October 2022 due to the cancellation of tournaments in China because of the ongoing COVID-19 pandemic.

Champions

Singles 

  Félix Auger-Aliassime def  J. J. Wolf, 6–4, 6–4

Doubles 

  Nicolas Mahut /  Édouard Roger-Vasselin def.  Ivan Dodig /  Austin Krajicek, 7–6(7–4), 6–3

Singles main-draw entrants

Seeds 

† Rankings are as of 3 October 2022.

Other entrants 
The following players received wildcards into the main draw:
  Francesco Maestrelli
  Francesco Passaro
  Giulio Zeppieri

The following players received entry from the qualifying draw:
  Altuğ Çelikbilek
  Flavio Cobolli
  Tim van Rijthoven
  Mikael Ymer

The following player received entry as a lucky loser:
  Zhang Zhizhen

Withdrawals 
  Nikoloz Basilashvili → replaced by  Brandon Nakashima
  David Goffin → replaced by  Zhang Zhizhen
  Filip Krajinović → replaced by  Richard Gasquet
  Jiří Lehečka → replaced by  Márton Fucsovics
  Gaël Monfils → replaced by  Roberto Carballés Baena
  Yoshihito Nishioka → replaced by  Corentin Moutet
  Holger Rune → replaced by  Bernabé Zapata Miralles
  Emil Ruusuvuori → replaced by  Daniel Elahi Galán
  Jannik Sinner → replaced by  J. J. Wolf

Doubles main-draw entrants

Seeds 

 1 Rankings as of 3 October 2022.

Other entrants 
The following pairs received wildcards into the doubles main draw:
  Jacopo Berrettini /  Matteo Berrettini
  Flavio Cobolli /  Giulio Zeppieri

Withdrawals 
  Marcelo Arévalo /  Jean-Julien Rojer → replaced by  Alexander Erler /  Lucas Miedler
  Ariel Behar /  Andrey Golubev → replaced by  Andrey Golubev /  Ben McLachlan
  Juan Sebastián Cabal /  Robert Farah → replaced by  Sadio Doumbia /  Fabien Reboul
  Nikola Ćaćić /  Filip Krajinović → replaced by  Maxime Cressy /  John-Patrick Smith
  Lloyd Glasspool /  Harri Heliövaara → replaced by  Nicolás Barrientos /  Miguel Ángel Reyes-Varela
  Kevin Krawietz /  Andreas Mies → replaced by  Roberto Carballés Baena /  Daniel Elahi Galán

References

External links 
 ATP tournament profile

Firenze Open
Firenze Open
Firenze Open